The Violinzither or Violinharp is a string instrument of the zither family, invented in 1925 by Clemens Neuber in Klingenthal. The instrument is a cross between the fretless chord zither and a concert zither.

History 
The instrument normally has eighteen melodic strings arranged in two vertical rows, with the scale alternating between rows. The instrument has a diatonic tuning in C major, with a range of two and a half octaves, from c' to f'' (C4 to F5). Some models of the instrument were also created with semichromatic or chromatic tunings.  with five or six sets of strings serving as an accompaniment, which are plucked with the left hand. A violin bow (about 55cm long) held by the right hand is used to play the melodic strings.

A variant of the violin zither, the concert violin harp, was created by Max Lausmann. Many violin zithers were sold under the name "Kalliope" by the company C. A. Wunderlich. Violinzithers have been manufactured luthier C. Robert Hopf since the 1920s.

References

See Also 

 Bowed Psaltery

Bowed string instruments
Chordophones
Box zithers